Curinga is a town and comune in the province of Catanzaro, in the Calabria region of southern Italy. The settlement has historically been inhabited by an Arbëreshë community, which now has assimilated.

1980 train crash
On November 21, 1980, a Rome-Syracuse passenger train hit the cars of a freight train from Catania, killing 20 people and injuring 112.

References

External links
 Official website

 

Arbëresh settlements 

Cities and towns in Calabria